The Midnight is the third EP released by electronica duo Lemon Jelly, according to the insert of Lemonjelly.ky,  on 17 July 2000. It was limited to 1,000  copies, the first 200 of which featured hand screen-printed sleeves. The tracks from the EP were later incorporated for more accessible listening into the critically acclaimed Lemonjelly.ky album. The cover had silver foil stamped on the inner sleeve and die-cut holes in the outer sleeve so when the record was pulled out of its sleeve, the stars twinkled in the night sky.

History
From 1998 to 2000, Franglen and Deakin released three limited-circulation EPs (The Bath (1998), The Yellow (1999), and The Midnight (2000)) on their very own label, Impotent Fury. The EPs were a critical success, and led to the duo being signed to XL Recordings.

Track listing
Unless otherwise indicated, Information is based on the Album’s Liner Notes

Personnel
Information is based on the Album’s Liner Notes

 Nick Franglen - band member, production
 Fred Deakin - band member, design, illustration, art direction
 Steve "Barney" Chase - audio mixing 
 John Hallam - vocals on "Page One"
 John Paul Jones - guitar, mandolin on "Come"

References

2000 EPs
Lemon Jelly albums
Albums produced by Nick Franglen